Her Awakening is a 1911 American short silent drama film starring Mabel Normand and directed by D. W. Griffith. Normand portrays a vivaciously effervescent young woman ashamed to introduce her poorly dressed mother to her elegant suitor. This early drama helped launch Normand's career and is believed to have been her second film and first substantial role. The supporting cast features Harry Hyde, Kate Bruce, Donald Crisp and Robert Harron.

The film was produced by the Biograph Company when it and many other early film studios in America's first motion picture industry were based in Fort Lee, New Jersey at the beginning of the 20th century and was exhibited at the Museum of Modern Art in New York City in 2006 as part of a one-night program about the city's brief reign as movie capital of the United States.

Cast
 Mabel Normand as The Daughter
 Harry Hyde as The Sweetheart
 Kate Bruce as The Mother
 Edwin August
 William J. Butler as A Doctor
 Donald Crisp as Accident Witness
 Frank Evans as Accident Witness
 Robert Harron as On Street/Accident Witness
 J. Jiquel Lanoe as A Doctor/Accident Witness
 Fred Mace as A Laundry Customer
 Charles Hill Mailes as Accident Witness
 Vivian Prescott as A Laundry Employee
 W.C. Robinson as Accident Witness
 Marion Sunshine
 Kate Toncray as Old Woman/Accident Witness

References

External links 

 

1911 films
1911 drama films
Silent American drama films
American silent short films
Biograph Company films
American black-and-white films
Films directed by D. W. Griffith
Films shot in Fort Lee, New Jersey
1911 short films
1910s American films